John Whitehall Dod (17 September 1797 – 8 July 1863) was a British Conservative politician.

John Whitehall Dod was born on 17 September 1797, in Calverhall Shropshire to John and Eleanor Dod

Parliamentery career
Dod was first elected Conservative MP for North Shropshire at a by-election in 1848—caused by the succession of Edward Herbert as the 3rd Earl of Powis—and held the seat until 1859 when he did not stand for re-election.

References

External links
 
John Whitehall Dod in England, birth and baptism, 1538-1975

1797 births
1863 deaths
Conservative Party (UK) MPs for English constituencies
UK MPs 1847–1852
UK MPs 1852–1857
UK MPs 1857–1859